Henrique Johann (born 11 October 1956) is a Brazilian rower. He competed in the men's coxed four event at the 1980 Summer Olympics.

References

External links
 

1956 births
Living people
Brazilian male rowers
Olympic rowers of Brazil
Rowers at the 1980 Summer Olympics
Place of birth missing (living people)
Pan American Games medalists in rowing
Pan American Games bronze medalists for Brazil
Rowers at the 1979 Pan American Games
Medalists at the 1979 Pan American Games